Alexandra of Russia may refer to:

Empress consorts of Russia
Irina Godunova (1557–1603), wife of Feodor I of Russia, who adopted the name Alexandra when she took the monastic vow
Alexandra Feodorovna (Charlotte of Prussia) (1798–1860), wife of Nicholas I of Russia
 Alexandra Feodorovna (Alix of Hesse) (1872–1918), wife of Nicholas II of Russia

Grand Duchesses of Russia by birth
 Grand Duchess Alexandra Nikolaevna of Russia (1825–1844), daughter of Nicholas I of Russia; first wife of Prince Frederick William of Hesse-Kassel
 Grand Duchess Alexandra Mikhailovna of Russia (1831–1832), daughter of Grand Duke Michael Pavlovich of Russia
 Grand Duchess Alexandra Alexandrovna of Russia (1842–1849), daughter of Alexander II of Russia

Grand Duchesses of Russia by marriage
 Grand Duchess Alexandra Georgievna of Russia, Princess Alexandra of Greece and Denmark, (1870–1891), daughter of George I of Greece; wife of Grand Duke Paul Alexandrovich of Russia as Grand Duchess Alexandra Georgievna of Russia 
 Princess Alexandra of Saxe-Altenburg (1830–1911), daughter of Joseph, Duke of Saxe-Altenburg; wife of Grand Duke Constantine Nikolaevich of Russia as Grand Duchess Alexandra Iosifovna of Russia  
 Duchess Alexandra Petrovna of Oldenburg (1838–1900), daughter of Duke Peter Georgievich of Oldenburg; wife of Grand Duke Nicholas Nikolaievich of Russia as Grand Duchess Alexandra Petrovna of Russia

See also
 Empress Alexandra Feodorovna of Russia (disambiguation)